Jamie Dwyer  (born 12 March 1979) is an Australian field hockey player. He currently plays for YMCC Coastal City Hockey Club in the Melville Toyota League in Perth, Western Australia. He also played for the Queensland Blades in the Australian Hockey League. He debuted for Australia as a junior player in 1995, and for the senior side in 2001. He has played over 350 matches for Australia and scored over 220 goals. He has represented Australia at the 2004 Summer Olympics where he won a gold medal and the 2008 Summer Olympics and 2012 Summer Olympics where Australia won bronze medals. He has also represented Australia at the 2006 Commonwealth Games where he won a gold medal and the 2010 Commonwealth Games where he also won gold. He has won silver medals at the 2002 Men's Hockey World Cup and the 2006 Men's Hockey World Cup. He won a gold medal at the 2010 Men's Hockey World Cup and the 2014 Men's Hockey World Cup. He is widely regarded as one of the greatest players to ever play the game.

Personal
Jamie Dwyer was born on 12 March 1979 in Rockhampton, Queensland. His nickname is Foetus. As a child, he played cricket. He is a long time Brisbane Lions fan and plays Australian rules fantasy football. His cousin was a national team teammate when Dwyer played for them. Matthew Gohdes. He met his wife-to-be while playing professional hockey in the Netherlands; the couple now have two sons and a daughter. When in Australia, he is based in Perth, Western Australia as that is where the national team is based. His present manager is former Test cricketer Stuart MacGill.

Field hockey
Jamie Dwyer is a midfielder/striker. In 1999, he had a scholarship with and played for the Australian Institute of Sport team.

Club hockey
Dwyer has played club hockey in Australia. In 1998, he played for the Easts club in the Brisbane-based competition. He currently plays in the top men's side at YMCC Coastal City Hockey Club in the Melville Toyota League. Since making his debut for the club in 2011, Jamie has played in 4 premierships.

Professional hockey
Dwyer plays professional hockey in Europe. In 2004, 2005 and 2006, he played professional hockey internationally in the Netherlands, where the hockey season lasts seven months. In 2009, he played professional hockey in the Netherlands for Bloemendaal H.C. Ten thousand people would show up to games he played in for his Dutch team. In 2008, he played for Laren in the Netherlands. In 2011, he played club hockey for Mannheim in Germany. In 2012, he was playing for the Bloemendaal H.C. in the Netherlands. Dwyer now plays in India for the Punjab Warriors.

State team
Dwyer did play for the Queensland Blades in the Australian Hockey League, and wears shirt number 1. He was with the team in 1997 as an eighteen-year-old 1998 as a nineteen-year-old. In 2010, he played in the final game of the season for Queensland in the Australian Hockey League.

National team
In 1995, Dwyer made his junior national team debut on the U18 and U21 sides. He played for the junior national team in 1996, 1997 and 1998.

Since making his senior side national team debut in 2001, Dwyer has played over 250 matches for Australia and scored over 150 goals. In 2001, he earned a silver medal in the Champions Trophy competition. In 2002, he won a silver medal at the World Cup. That year, he also won a gold medal at the 2002 Commonwealth Games. His team finished fifth at the 2002 Champions Trophy tournament. In 2003, his team finished second in the Champions Trophy competition. He injured himself in the tournament when he tore the anterior cruciate ligament in his left knee. Going into the Athens Olympics, he was recovering from a knee injury. He is famous for scoring an extra time goal in the final of the 2004 Olympics, which resulted in Australia winning the gold medal and being the best player in the world. In 2005, he earned a gold medal at the Champions Trophy competition. In 2006, he won a silver medal at the World Cup. His team finished fourth at the 2006 Champions Trophy tournament. He also won a gold medal at the 2006 Commonwealth Games. By March 2006, he had 122 caps and 79 goals for Australia. In 2007, his team finished second in the Champions Trophy. In December 2007, he was a member of the Kookaburras squad that competed in the Dutch series in Canberra. In 2008, his team finished first in the Champions Trophy competition. He won a bronze medal at the 2008 Summer Olympics. He was carried off the pitch with a hip injury in the middle of the game against Canada that Australia won 6–1. New national team coach Ric Charlesworth named him, a returning member, alongside fourteen total new players who had fewer than 10 national team caps to the squad before in April 2009 in a bid to ready the team for the 2010 Commonwealth Games. In 2009, he participated in two test matched against Spain in Perth in the lead up to the Champions Trophy. In 2009, he won a gold medal at the Men's Hockey Champions Trophy competition. He was a member of the national team in 2010. That year, he was a member of the team that finished first at the Hockey Champions Trophy. In 2010, he also represented Australia at the Commonwealth Games, and played in the game against Pakistan during the group stage. In the gold medal match against India that Australia won 8–0, he captained the side and scored a goal. He also won a gold medal at the World Cup and the Champions Trophy in 2010. While at the 2010 World Cup, the Indian hosts provided extensive security for him and other hockey competitors.  The Sydney Morning Herald said he said it was the tightest security he had ever seen as a competitor in an international competition. He did not compete at the Azlan Shah Cup in Malaysia in May 2011 because he was injured. In December 2011, he was named as one of twenty-eight players to be on the 2012 Summer Olympics Australian men's national training squad.  This squad will be narrowed in June 2012.  He trained with the team from 18 January to mid-March in Perth, Western Australia. In February during the training camp, he played in a four nations test series with the teams being the Kookaburras, Australia A squad, the Netherlands and Argentina. He played for the Kookoaburras against Argentina in the second game of the series where his team won 3–1. He had a short break from training following the test series. He is one of several Queensland based players likely to play in a three-game test series to be played in Cairns, Queensland from 22 to 25 June against the New Zealand Black Sticks. Final Olympic section will occur several days before this test and his inclusion in the series will be contingent upon being selected. Dwyer does not play for the National team anymore.

Coaching
Dwyer has coached field hockey. In 2011, he coached a junior boys team at the YMCC Coastal City Hockey Club. In February 2011, he ran two clinics for young hockey players at the Joondalup Lakers Hockey Club. In 2019, Jamie coached a junior 5/6 boys YMCC Coastal City Hockey Club team.

Recognition
Dwyer has been recognised for his hockey play. In 2002, he was honoured by being named the Young Player of the Year by the International Hockey Federation. In 2004 and 2007, he was named the IHF World Player of the Year. In the 2005 Australia Day Honours Dwyer was awarded the Medal of the Order of Australia (OAM). In 2007, he was named the Captain of the World Team. In 2011, he was named the international field hockey player of the year. In 2011, he was named in the World All-Star Team. In 2011, he was inducted into the Australian Institute of Sport 'Best of the Best'. On 18 June 2012, Jamie Dwyer was appointed to lead the number one Australian side in London Olympics. In 2021, Dwyer was inducted into the Sport Australia Hall of Fame.

References

External links
 
 
 
 
 
 
 
 

1979 births
Australian male field hockey players
Living people
Commonwealth Games gold medallists for Australia
Olympic medalists in field hockey
Olympic gold medalists for Australia
Olympic bronze medalists for Australia
Field hockey people from Queensland
Male field hockey midfielders
Male field hockey forwards
Field hockey players at the 2004 Summer Olympics
Field hockey players at the 2008 Summer Olympics
2002 Men's Hockey World Cup players
2006 Men's Hockey World Cup players
2010 Men's Hockey World Cup players
2014 Men's Hockey World Cup players
Field hockey players at the 2002 Commonwealth Games
Field hockey players at the 2006 Commonwealth Games
Field hockey players at the 2010 Commonwealth Games
Sportspeople from Rockhampton
Field hockey players at the 2012 Summer Olympics
Olympic field hockey players of Australia
Medalists at the 2012 Summer Olympics
Medalists at the 2008 Summer Olympics
Medalists at the 2004 Summer Olympics
People from Tamworth, New South Wales
Field hockey players at the 2016 Summer Olympics
Commonwealth Games medallists in field hockey
Recipients of the Medal of the Order of Australia
HC Bloemendaal players
Expatriate field hockey players
Australian expatriate sportspeople in the Netherlands
Hockey India League players
Sport Australia Hall of Fame inductees
Medallists at the 2002 Commonwealth Games
Medallists at the 2006 Commonwealth Games
Medallists at the 2010 Commonwealth Games